Katherine Louise Stuart (born 18 May 1967) is an English former sprinter. She won a silver medal in the 200 metres at the 1985 European Junior Championships, and went on to represent Great Britain in the women's 200 metres at the 1988 Seoul Olympics.

International competitions

References

External links
 

1967 births
Living people
Sportspeople from Middlesbrough
English female sprinters
British female sprinters
Olympic athletes of Great Britain
Athletes (track and field) at the 1988 Summer Olympics
Universiade medalists in athletics (track and field)
Universiade silver medalists for Great Britain
Medalists at the 1991 Summer Universiade
Olympic female sprinters